Western Caravans is a 1939 American Western film directed by Sam Nelson and written by Bennett Cohen. The film stars Charles Starrett, Iris Meredith, Dick Curtis, Russell Simpson, Wally Wales and Hank Bell. The film was released on June 15, 1939, by Columbia Pictures.

Plot

Cast          
Charles Starrett as Jim Carson
Iris Meredith as Joyce Thompson
Dick Curtis as Mort Kohler
Russell Simpson as Winchester Thompson
Wally Wales as Joel Winters
Hank Bell as Hank
Bob Nolan as Bob
Sammy McKim as Matt Winters
Edmund Cobb as Tex
Ethan Laidlaw as Tip
Glenn Strange as Scanlon
Jack Rockwell as Cole
George Chesebro as Mac
Sam Garrett as Joe
John Rand as Jennings
Edward Hearn as Murdock
Steve Clark as Mac
Jack Montgomery as Joe

References

External links
 

1939 films
American Western (genre) films
1939 Western (genre) films
Columbia Pictures films
Films directed by Sam Nelson
American black-and-white films
1930s English-language films
1930s American films